Stari Most, also known as Mostar Bridge, is a rebuilt 16th-century Ottoman bridge in the city of Mostar in Bosnia and Herzegovina that crosses the river Neretva and connects the two parts of the city. On 9 November 1993 Stari Most collapsed due to shelling by the Croatian Defence Council (HVO) during the Croat–Bosniak War because the Army of the Republic of Bosnia and Herzegovina (ARBiH) used it as a military supply line. The Old Bridge was deemed a legitimate military target by the International Criminal Tribunal for the former Yugoslavia, since the ARBiH used it for military purposes. Subsequently, a project was set in motion to reconstruct it; the rebuilt bridge opened on 23 July 2004.

The bridge is considered an exemplary piece of Balkan Islamic architecture and was commissioned by Suleiman the Magnificent in 1557. It was designed by Mimar Hayruddin, a student and apprentice of architect Mimar Sinan who built many of the Sultan's key buildings in Istanbul and around the empire.

Characteristics
The bridge spans the Neretva river in the old town of Mostar, the city to which it gave the name. The city is the fifth-largest in the country; it is the center of the Herzegovina-Neretva Canton of the Federation of Bosnia and Herzegovina, and the unofficial capital of Herzegovina. Two fortified towers protect it: the Halebija tower on the northeast and the Tara tower on the southwest, called "the bridge keepers" (natively mostari).

Instead of foundations, the bridge has abutments of limestone linked to wing walls along the waterside cliffs. The start of the arch is emphasized by a molding  in height.

History

The original bridge replaced an older wooden suspension bridge of dubious stability. Construction began in 1557 and took nine years: according to the inscription the bridge was completed in 974 AH, corresponding to the period between 19 July 1566  and 7 July 1567. Little is known of the construction of the bridge, thought to have been made from mortar made with egg whites, and all that has been preserved in writing are memories and legends and the name of the builder, Mimar Hayruddin. Charged under pain of death to construct a bridge of such unprecedented dimensions, Hayruddin reportedly prepared for his own funeral on the day the scaffolding was finally removed from the completed structure. Upon its completion it was the widest man-made arch in the world. 

The 17th Century Ottoman explorer Evliya Çelebi wrote that the bridge "is like a rainbow arch soaring up to the skies, extending from one cliff to the other... I, a poor and miserable slave of Allah, have passed through 16 countries, but I have never seen such a high bridge. It is thrown from rock to rock as high as the sky."

As Mostar's economic and administrative importance grew with the growing presence of Ottoman rule, the precarious wooden suspension bridge over the Neretva gorge required replacement. The old bridge on the river "...was made of wood and hung on chains," wrote the Ottoman geographer Katip Çelebi, and it "...swayed so much that people crossing it did so in mortal fear". In 1566, Mimar Hayruddin designed the bridge, which was said to have cost 300,000 Drams (silver coins) to build. The two-year construction project was supervised by Karagoz Mehmet Bey, Sultan Suleiman's son-in-law and the patron of Mostar's most important mosque complex, the Hadzi Mehmed Karadzozbeg Mosque.

Destruction 

During the Croat–Bosniak War, the Bosniak Army of the Republic of Bosnia and Herzegovina used the Old Bridge as a military supply line. Slobodan Praljak, the commander of the Croat Defence Council ordered the destruction of the bridge which collapsed on 9 November 1993 as a result of shelling by the Bosnian Croat forces. The International Criminal Tribunal for the former Yugoslavia found it to be a legitimate military target as the opposing Army of the Republic of Bosnia and Herzegovina used it for military purposes.

The first temporary bridge on the traces of the Old Bridge was open on 30 December 1993; built in only three days by Spanish military engineers assigned to the United Nations Protection Force (UNPROFOR) mission. The temporary structure was subsequently upgraded three times, to eventually link the shores with a more secure cable-stayed bridge until the proper reconstruction of the Old Bridge.

Newspapers based in Sarajevo reported that more than 60 shells hit the bridge before it collapsed. Croatian General and sentenced war-criminal, Slobodan Praljak, in attempt to absolve himself and his military units from responsibility and prosecution for the destruction of the bridge and other crimes committed during the war, published a document, "How the Old Bridge Was Destroyed", where he argues that there was supposedly an explosive charge or mine placed at the center of the bridge underneath and detonated remotely, in addition to the shelling, which caused the collapse. Most historians dismiss these claims, and disagree with its conclusions.

After the destruction of the Stari Most, a spokesman for the Croats said that they deliberately destroyed it, because it was of strategic importance. Academics have argued that the bridge held little strategic value and that its shelling was an example of deliberate cultural property destruction. Given that mosques, synagogues, and churches in Mostar were in proximity, the Old Bridge was targeted for the symbolic significance it served in connecting diverse communities. Andras Riedlmayer terms the destruction an act of "killing memory", in which evidence of a shared cultural heritage and peaceful co-existence were deliberately destroyed.

Reconstruction

After the end of the war, plans were raised to reconstruct the bridge. The World Bank, the United Nations Educational, Scientific and Cultural Organization (UNESCO), the Aga Khan Trust for Culture and the World Monuments Fund formed a coalition to oversee the reconstruction of the Stari Most and the historic city centre of Mostar. Additional funding was provided by Italy, the Netherlands, Turkey, Croatia and the Council of Europe Development Bank, as well as the Government of BiH. In October 1998, UNESCO established an international committee of experts to oversee the design and reconstruction work. It was decided to build a bridge as similar as possible to the original, using the same technology and materials.

The bridge was re-built in two phases: the first one being led by Hungarian army engineers, consisting in the lifting of submerged material for its repurpose; and the second one being the removal of the temporary bridge, task assigned to Spanish army engineers, and the reconstruction of the Old Bridge with Ottoman construction techniques by a partnership of civil engineering companies led by the Turkish Er-Bu. Tenelia, a fine-grained limestone, sourced from local quarries was used and Hungarian army divers recovered stones from the original bridge from the river below, although most were too damaged to reuse.

Reconstruction commenced on 7 June 2001. The reconstructed bridge was inaugurated on 23 July 2004, with the cost estimated to be 15.5 million US dollars.

Diving

Stari Most diving is a traditional annual competition in diving organized every year in mid summer (end of July). It is traditional for the young men of the town to leap from the bridge into the Neretva. As the Neretva is very cold, this is a risky feat and requires skill and training, though according to TripAdvisor, tourists do dive as well. In 1968 a formal diving competition was inaugurated and held every summer. The first person to jump from the bridge since it was re-opened was Enej Kelecija.

Since 2015, Stari Most has been a tour stop in the Red Bull Cliff Diving World Series. In 2019 the diving was featured on Series 2, episode 3 of ''The Misadventures of Romesh Ranganathan.

In popular culture
 Turkish rock band Bulutsuzluk Özlemi's 1996 song "Yaşamaya Mecbursun" (lit. 'You have to live') is about the destruction of Stari Most.

See also
List of bridges in Bosnia and Herzegovina
List of World Heritage Sites in Bosnia and Herzegovina
List of National Monuments of Bosnia and Herzegovina
Tourism in Bosnia and Herzegovina
Museum of the Old Bridge
History of Bosnia and Herzegovina

References

External links

Rehabilitation Design of the Old Bridge of Mostar
The Old Bridge / Stari Most -  Commission to Preserve National Monuments of Bosnia and Herzegovina
 Live webcams from Stari most and the Old town.  (mirror)

Bridges over the Neretva in Bosnia and Herzegovina
National Monuments of Bosnia and Herzegovina
World Heritage Sites in Bosnia and Herzegovina
Ottoman bridges in Bosnia and Herzegovina
Bridges completed in 1566
Buildings and structures in Mostar
Demolished bridges
Buildings and structures demolished in 1993
Rebuilt buildings and structures in Bosnia and Herzegovina
Bridges completed in 2004
Articles containing video clips
Stone arch bridges in Bosnia and Herzegovina
Mimar Hayruddin buildings
Medieval Bosnia and Herzegovina architecture